GHA Coaches was a bus and coach operator serving North East Wales, Cheshire, and Shropshire. It also operated bus services extending into Telford & Wrekin, Staffordshire, Gwynedd, and Merseyside.

GHA Coaches ceased trading after entering administration on 13 July 2016. Former GHA services are now operated by a variety of operators including Arriva North West, Lloyds Coaches, Stagecoach, High Peak and D&G Bus.

History
GHA Coaches was founded by Eifion Lloyd Davies in 1990 and was originally based in Corwen before moving to Ruabon in the mid-1990s. It later expanded with the purchase of a number of other local companies, including:

Hanmers Coaches, Southsea
Chaloner's Buses, Moss
Bryn Melyn, Llangollen
Vale (of Llangollen) Travel, Cefn Mawr
JO Travel, Ponciau
Pat's Coaches, New Broughton (bus operations only)
RS Travel, Middlewich
Dobsons, Lostock Gralam
Shropshire Bus & Coach, Shrewsbury

Despite being founded in north east Wales, only about half of the bus services run by the company at the time of closure were in this area. Services extended as far north as Manchester and Rhyl, to Hanley and Telford in the east, to Shrewsbury in the south and to Barmouth in the west.

Coach operations
Many coaches were inherited with the purchase of Hanmers Coaches, though as with the bus operations, the coach fleet expanded rapidly. Most coaches carried a livery of silver with red and burgundy stripes and the GHA Coaches name; some were in a similar livery with a white base and the Vale Travel name; some carried a plain yellow livery for school work.

The most common use for the coach fleet was school transport, and GHA had a number of high-capacity coaches dedicated to this work. Coaches were also used for private hire and occasional day trip and holiday work.

Depots
GHA's headquarters were at Ruabon. Other depots were at Tarvin, Ruthin, Shrewsbury and Winsford. Vehicles also operated an outstation at Betws Gwerfil Goch, which was the original base of the company.

Fleet
As at June 2015 the fleet consisted of 325 buses and coaches.

GHA Gold
In October 2014 GHA launched a 'GHA Gold' brand on the 88 Knutsford to Wilmslow to Altrincham route.  They acquired four new Alexander Dennis Enviro200 buses which have WiFi, leather seats, wood effect flooring, a passenger information system and one table on each bus.  These vehicles carried branding for the route. They were funded by Waters Corporation as part of a public transport commitment in order for them to get planning permission for building a new large employment site just outside Morley Green.  Two of the buses are now owned and operated by Redline buses of Aylesbury who kept the Gold service branding, using them on their service 21 in and around Milton Keynes.

GHA went on to launch a second Gold route between Congleton and Crewe the following year.

Bus wars 
Following GHA taking over a couple of bus routes in the Northwich area they launched an hourly 45 Northwich to Warrington service running 5 minutes ahead of an existing hourly service operated by Network Warrington, followed by a 16 service between Warrington and Dallam again running just ahead of an existing Network Warrington service.  Two new Optare Metrocity buses were acquired to operate the Warrington services.  The bus war led to constant timetable changes by both operators and eventually Network Warrington deciding to route all their Northwich to Warrington services via Barnton.  At times GHA drivers were known to block bus stands to prevent Network Warrington drivers picking up passengers, which on occasions led to angry exchanges between drivers and on one occasion a GHA driver committed a physical assault on a Network Warrington driver for which he received a suspended jail term.

Administration
After GHA failed to pay almost £1m in taxes, HMRC took out a court order against GHA placing the company in to administration.  The administrators found the company had debts of £5.3m, meaning there was no viable way to keep the business going meaning operations were suspended on the evening of 13 July 2016 and assets of the company were put up for sale in order to recover as much of the debts as possible.

At the same time, a public inquiry was carried out into the safety of GHA Coaches vehicles, after 49 buses in the fleet of 161 were found to be unroadworthy.

Gareth Lloyd Davies and Arwyn Lloyd Davies set up a new operation using an 'RJs of Wem' operating licence they had acquired following GHA Coaches' acquisition of Shropshire Bus and Coach and started operating some former GHA routes in the Wrexham area.  However, at the public inquiry the Traffic Commissioner banned the two Lloyd-Davies brothers from any involvement in any bus companies.  This led to Sally Ann Lloyd Davies (Gareth's wife) taking over the new operation  However, at a separate public inquiry the Traffic Commissioner revoked the licence belonging to RJs of Wem with effect from 19 December 2016.

References

External links

Company website

Transport companies established in 1990
2016 disestablishments in the United Kingdom
Bus wars
British companies established in 1990
Transport companies disestablished in 2016
Former bus operators in Wales
Former coach operators in England
Former bus operators in Cheshire
Former bus operators in Shropshire
Former bus operators in Staffordshire
Former bus operators in Merseyside